Borów  is a village in the administrative district of Gmina Annopol, within Kraśnik County, Lublin Voivodeship, in eastern Poland.

The village used to be called Birkholz, when it was part of Germany. 

The village has a population of 500.

References

Villages in Kraśnik County